Langarud is an electoral district in the Gilan Province in Iran.

References

See also 

Electoral districts of Gilan Province